Theodore Boone: Kid Lawyer, known as Theodore Boone: Young Lawyer in the UK, is a 2010 legal drama and the first novel by John Grisham for middle-grade children (8-13 year olds). It is the first in a series about Theodore Boone. Grisham jokingly said in an interview that he wanted to catch up with Harry Potter, since his number one place was taken in the bestsellers.

Sequels

John Grisham has written seven books in total in the Theodore Boone series, which were published between 2010 and 2019.

External links
 UK site for Theodore Boone: Young Lawyer

References

2010 American novels
2010 children's books
Novels by John Grisham
Courtroom novels
American children's novels
Dutton Children's Books books